The 2012–13 season is Wofoo Tai Po's 7th season in the Hong Kong First Division League. Wofoo Tai Po will seek to win their first trophy for 3 seasons, competing in the Hong Kong First Division League, the Senior Challenge Shield and the FA Cup.

Key Events
 6 July 2012: Manager Cheung Po Chun announced that Naves Mesquita Aender and Alex Tayo Akande join the team from Sham Shui Po and Hong Kong Sapling respectively.
 6 January 2013: Wofoo Tai Po made a comeback from 0–1 down to defeat Southern 3–1 in aggregate in the semi-finals of Senior Shield and reach the final of the tournament for the first time in club history.
 12 January 2013: Nigerian forward Caleb Ekwegwo re-joins the club as a free transfer. Caleb represented the club for 15 times and scored 9 times during his time at the club in 2009.
 27 January 2013: Wofoo Tai Po defeated Citizen 5–3 in penalties after a 2–2 tie after 90 minutes and extra time against Citizen and win the champions of Senior Shield. They are guaranteed a place in the 2013 Hong Kong AFC Cup play-offs.
 4 May 2013: Wofoo Tai Po failed to stay in the top-tier division as Yokohama FC Hong Kong's Kenji Fukuda scored in the stoppage time of the match, sending Tai Po into the Second Division.
 18 May 2013: Wofoo Tai Po finished the season with a narrow defeat against Tuen Mun in the 2013 Hong Kong AFC Cup play-offs semi-finals.

Players

First team
As of 27 January 2013.

Remarks:
FP These players are registered as foreign players.

Players with dual nationalities:
  Christian Annan (Local player)
  Chen Liming (Local player, eligible to play for Hong Kong national football team)
  Ye Jia (Local Player, eligible to play for Hong Kong national football team)
  Che Run Qiu (Local player, eligible to play for Hong Kong national football team)
  Jing Teng (Local player, eligible to play for Hong Kong national football team)

Transfers

In

Out

Stats

Squad Stats

Top scorers
As of 18 May 2013

Disciplinary record
As of 18 May 2013

Competitions

Overall

First Division League

Classification

Results summary

Results by round

Matches

Pre-season

Competitive

First Division League

Senior Challenge Shield

First round

Quarter-finals

Semi-finals

Final

FA Cup

First round

Quarter-finals

Semi-finals

Hong Kong AFC Cup play-offs

Remarks: 
1 The capacity of Aberdeen Sports Ground is originally 9,000, but only the 4,000-seated main stand is opened for football match.
2 Wofoo Tai Po's home match against Southern of FA Cup first round will be played at Kowloon Bay Park instead of Wofoo Tai Po's home ground Tai Po Sports Ground.

References

Tai Po FC seasons
Tai

zh:和富大埔 2012-13賽季